The 2013 League of Ireland Cup, also known as the 2013 EA Sports Cup, is the 40th season of the Irish football knockout competition.

A total of 22 teams have entered the 2013 competition. The 12 League of Ireland Premier Division and 8 League of Ireland First Division clubs were joined by Ulster Senior League runners up Cockhill Celtic and the Mayo League representative side. For the First and Second rounds of the competition, all participating clubs will be split into 4 regional pools while the further rounds of the competitions will have an open draw. The 2013 competition will commence with the First round on 2 March 2013.

Teams

First round
The draw for the First Round took place on 30 January 2013. The First Round games were played on the 2, 3, 11 and 19 March 2013.

|colspan="4" style="background-color:#99CCCC" align="center"|Pool 1
||
Report
|-
|colspan="4" style="background-color:#99CCCC" align="center"|Pool 2
||
Report
||
Report
|-
|colspan="4" style="background-color:#99CCCC" align="center"|Pool 3
||
Report
|-
|colspan="4" style="background-color:#99CCCC" align="center"|Pool 4
||
Report
||
Report
|}

Second round
The draw for the Second Round took place on 3 April 2013. The Second Round games were played on the 20 and 21 May 2013.

|colspan="3" style="background-color:#99CCCC" align="center"|Pool 1

|-
|colspan="3" style="background-color:#99CCCC" align="center"|Pool 2

|-
|colspan="3" style="background-color:#99CCCC" align="center"|Pool 3

|-
|colspan="3" style="background-color:#99CCCC" align="center"|Pool 4

|}

Quarter-finals
The draw for the quarter-finals was made on 10 June 2013. All of the remaining teams play in the League of Ireland Premier Division; this had not happened since 2005. The tie between Shamrock Rovers and St. Patrick's Athletic was postponed from 1 July due to the latter club travelling to Lithuania for a Europa League fixture.

Semi-finals
The draw for the quarter-finals was made on 8 July 2013.

Final

The final, which was broadcast live on Setanta Sports, took place at Tallaght Stadium, the home ground of finalists Shamrock Rovers, on 21 September 2013. The 2012 League of Ireland Cup Final was also contested by Drogheda United and Shamrock Rovers at Tallaght Stadium.
Shamrock Rovers won the game 2–0 with a penalty from Gary McCabe in the 11th minute and Thomas Stewart scoring the second in the 58th minute when he slotted the ball past the goalkeeper after a pass by Paul O'Connor.

References

Cup
3
League of Ireland Cup seasons